Romanovo is a rural locality (a selo) in Seletskoye Rural Settlement, Suzdalsky District, Vladimir Oblast, Russia. The population was 23 as of 2010. There are 2 streets.

Geography 
Romanovo is located on the Irmes River, 8 km northwest of Suzdal (the district's administrative centre) by road. Menchakovo is the nearest rural locality.

References 

Rural localities in Suzdalsky District